Moorleah is a rural locality in the local government area of Waratah-Wynyard in the North West region of Tasmania.
The 2016 census determined a population of 148 for the state suburb of Moorleah.

History
The locality was originally known as Upper Flowerdale. It was gazetted in 1966.

Geography
The Flowerdale River forms the western boundary, and the Inglis River forms much of the eastern boundary.

Road infrastructure
The C229 route (Preolenna Road) enters from the north-east and runs through to the south before exiting. Route C230 (Lapoinya Road) starts at an intersection with Route C229 and runs west before exiting.

References

Localities of Waratah–Wynyard Council
Towns in Tasmania